Liolaemus vallecurensis is a species of lizard in the family Iguanidae or the family Liolaemidae. The species is endemic to Argentina.

References

vallecurensis
Lizards of South America
Reptiles of Argentina
Endemic fauna of Argentina
Reptiles described in 1992